Sir Sydney Hugo Nicholson  (9 February 1875 – 30 May 1947) was an English choir director, organist, composer, and founder of the Royal School of Church Music (RSCM) and the compiler of The Parish Psalter.

Life
Nicholson was born in London to Sir Charles Nicholson, 1st Baronet, and his wife, Sarah Elizabeth Nicholson ( Keightley). His elder brother was  architect Sir Charles Nicholson; his younger brother was the stained-glass artist Archibald Keightley Nicholson.

He was educated at  New College, Oxford and the Royal College of Music. At this last-named institution, he studied the organ. He then served as organist at Barnet Parish Church (1897–1903), Carlisle Cathedral (1904), Lower Chapel, Eton College (1904–1908), Manchester Cathedral (1908–1919), and Westminster Abbey (1919–1928). Along with maintaining his organist posts, he edited the Hymns Ancient and Modern supplement that was published in 1916; he did not live to see the 1950 revised edition.

Something momentous would have to occur to persuade most away from playing the organ at the prestigious Westminster Abbey, but such was the case with Nicholson who was so concerned at the sad state of choral music in the parish churches throughout the country that in 1927 he founded the School of English Church Music (now the RSCM), in the hope of rectifying the problem. The School's members initially met at St Sepulchre-without-Newgate.

One of Nicholson's most successful compositions for parish choirs was his Communion Service in G, which was widely sung, especially in Anglo-Catholic churches, until recent times. He was warden of St Nicholas College, Chislehurst (1928–1939).

In addition to having edited Hymns Ancient and Modern, still the standard hymn book in many Anglican churches today, Nicholson wrote several hymn tunes. Of these, the most famous are Crucifer for the popular processional hymn Lift High the Cross and Totteridge. In 1928 he received the Lambeth DMus, and a decade later he was knighted for his services to Church music. He died at Ashford, Kent at the age of 72, and was buried at Westminster Abbey.

Works

Books on Church Music 

 Church Music (1920) London: Faith Press
 Boy's Choirs (1922) Glasgow
 Church Music A Practical Handbook (1927) London: Faith Press
 In Quires and Places where they sing (1932) London: Bell
 Peter: Adventures of a chorister 1137-1937 (1944) London: SPCK (fiction)
 Practical Methods of Choir Training (1947) London: SPCK (now RSCM)
 The Elements of Extemporisation (n.d.) Croydon: RSCM

Anthems 

 An Ode on the Birth of our Saviour
 Cleanse us, O Lord
 God be in my head
 Let us with a gladsome mind
 Love divine, all loves excelling
 My song is love unknown
 Teach us, good Lord, to serve Thee (boys' voices)

Cantata 

 The Saviour of the World

Canticles 

 Evening Service in D-flat major
 Evening Service on Parisian Tones
 Communion Service in G major
 Jubilate in F major (boys' voices)

Hymn tunes 

 AIRLIE
 BOW BRICKHILL
 CHISLEHURST
 CRUCIFER
 FENITON
 HOSANNA IN EXCELSIS
 LYTLINGTON
 TOTTERIDGE
 TRAFALGAR

Opera 

 The Boy Bishop: an Opera for Boys (1926)

External links

References

1875 births
1947 deaths
English classical organists
British male organists
Cathedral organists
English classical composers
People from Ashford, Kent
People educated at Rugby School
Alumni of New College, Oxford
Alumni of the Royal College of Music
Classical composers of church music
Knights Bachelor
Composers awarded knighthoods
Musicians awarded knighthoods
Burials at Westminster Abbey
Master of the Choristers at Westminster Abbey
Members of the Royal Victorian Order
Musicians from Kent
Younger sons of baronets
English male classical composers
Male classical organists